Euxoa tibetana is a moth of the family Noctuidae. It is found from the western and southern parts of the Himalaya through the Karakoram to the western border of the Pamir Mountains.

External links
Der Nadelholzgürtel im westlichen Himalaja-Gebirge Krummholz, Buschwerke und Rasenformationen oberhalb der Nadelwald-Grenze

Euxoa
Moths described in 1878